Zeenat Siddiqui (Sindhi: زينت صديقي, Birth 1947) was one of the leading folk singers of Sindh. Born in Matiari, Sindh, she is famous for her soulful folk songs.

Biography 
Zeenat Siddiqui was born in 1947 in Matiari, Sindh, Pakistan. Her father Akhund Fazal Siddiqui was a poet and they were descendants of the Murids of Shah Abdul Latif Bhittai. The ancestor of the Siddiqui Akhunds, Abdullah Akhund had been gifted a ralli by Shah Abdul Latif Bhittai which is present in Zeenat Siddiqui's house which was of Shah Abdul Latif Bhittai himself. She received primary education from Matiari and Hyderabad and passed matriculation examination from Government Miran School Hyderabad Sindh. She earned a Bachelor of Arts degree from Zubaida Girls College Hyderabad.

She started singing hamds, naats and folk songs in her school functions when she was a class VII student. Her teachers Razia Panah Ali Shah and Mrs Mumtaz Qureshi encouraged her for singing. She was introduced on Radio Pakistan Hyderabad by producer Ghulam Hussain Shaikh. Her first two songs, listed below were recorded at Radio Pakistan Hyderabad when she was a college student:

Menhan Waseen Toon Chho na, Meahan waseen Chho na (Sindhi: مينھن وسين تون ڇو نہ مينھن وسين ڇو)
 Hor wahiyo ray ho, hor ta tuhinjay bhairan jo (Sindhi: ھور وھيو ڙي ھور، ھور تہ تنھنجي ڀائرن جو)

She had a son named Asim Ali Akhund who was a remarked socialist speaker and philosopher of Hyderabad and had children in Russia, he is deceased. her remaining daughters in this world are only 3, Sanam Atta Rajpar (Formerly Sanam Akhund Siddiquie before marriage), Sheeba Akhund (Asma Akhund), and Saima Akhund. Saima Akhund has one child named Basit Burfat, Sanam Atta Rajpar also has one son named Hasnain Raza Rajpar, and Asma/Sheeba Akhund has one son named Jibran Khoso. Asim Ali Akhund had 1 daughter, 2 sons with his wife in Russia. She also had a deceased daughter named Kanwal Akhund who had 2 sons namely, Muhammad Salar Akhund, and Asim Ali Akhund (Named after her deceased brother). The daughters and son listed here are the ones who had offspring, many of Zeenat Siddiqui's children didn't survive. Zeenat Siddiqui's husband was Liaquat Ali Akhund who was one of her relative, Liaquat Ali Akhund has passed away.

She learnt music from Master Muhammad Ibrahim, Ustad Pretamdas and Dadi Leela Vati. Her folk songs got considerable popularity among radio listeners. She also used to recite naats in Meelads and such other religious gatherings.

References 

 Sindhi-language singers
 Sindhi people
 20th-century Pakistani women singers
 People from Matiari District
 1947 births